Abu’l-ʿAbbās Aḥmad ibn Jaʿfar (– 14 October 892), better known by his regnal name al-Muʿtamid ʿalā ’llāh ('Dependent on God'), was the caliph of the Abbasid Caliphate from 870 to 892. His reign marks the end of the "Anarchy at Samarra" and the start of the Abbasid restoration, but he was largely a ruler in name only. Power was held by his brother al-Muwaffaq, who held the loyalty of the military. Al-Mu'tamid's authority was circumscribed further after a failed attempt to flee to the domains controlled by Ahmad ibn Tulun in late 882, and he was placed under house arrest by his brother. In 891, when al-Muwaffaq died, loyalists attempted to restore power to the Caliph, but were quickly overcome by al-Muwaffaq's son al-Mu'tadid, who assumed his father's powers. When al-Mu'tamid died in 892, al-Mu'tadid succeeded him as caliph.

Life

The future al-Mu'tamid was a son of Caliph al-Mutawakkil and a Kufan slave girl called Fityan. His full name was Ahmad ibn Abi Jaʿfar, and was also known by the patronymic Abu'l-Abbas and from his mother as Ibn Fityan. After al-Muhtadi was deposed by the Turkish commanders Bayakbak and Yarjukh, he was selected by the military as his successor and proclaimed Caliph with the regnal name al-Muʿtamid ʿAlā ’llāh on 16 or 19 June 870. On 21 June, al-Muhtadi was executed.

Reign and relationship with al-Muwaffaq

The accession of al-Mu'tamid brought an end to the turmoils of the "Anarchy at Samarra", which had begun with the murder of al-Mutawakkil in 861. Caliphal authority in the provinces collapsed during that period, with the result that the central government lost effective control over most of the Caliphate outside the metropolitan region of Iraq. In the west, Egypt had fallen under the control of the ambitious Turkish soldier Ahmad ibn Tulun, who also had designs on Syria, while Khurasan and most of the Islamic East had been taken over by the Saffarids under Ya'qub ibn al-Layth, who replaced the Abbasid's loyal governor, Muhammad ibn Tahir. Most of the Arabian peninsula was likewise lost to local potentates, while in Tabaristan a radical Zaydi Shi'a dynasty took power. Even in Iraq, a rebellion of the Zanj slaves had begun and soon threatened Baghdad itself, while further south the Qarmatians were a nascent threat. In addition, al-Mu'tamid's position was undermined from within, as during the coups of the previous years real power had come to lie with the elite Turkish troops, and with al-Mu'tamid's brother Abu Ahmad Talha, who, as the Caliphate's main military commander, served as the chief intermediary between the caliphal government and the Turks. When Caliph al-Mu'tazz died in 869, there was even popular agitation in Baghdad in favour of his elevation to Caliph.

In contrast to his brother, al-Mu'tamid appears to have lacked any experience of, and involvement in, politics, as well as a power base he could rely on. At the time al-Muhtadi was killed by the Turks, Abu Ahmad was at Mecca. Immediately he hastened north to Samarra, where he and Musa ibn Bugha effectively sidelined al-Mu'tamid, and assumed control of the government. Al-Mu'tamid was thus quickly reduced to a figurehead ruler, which remained the case for the remainder of his reign. Within a short time, Abu Ahmad was conferred an extensive governorate covering most of the lands still under caliphal authority: western Arabia, southern Iraq with Baghdad, and Fars. To denote his authority, he assumed an honorific name in the style of the caliphs, al-Muwaffaq bi-Allah. As one of the few vestiges of actual power, al-Mu'tamid retained the right to appoint his own viziers, originally choosing the experienced Ubayd Allah ibn Yahya ibn Khaqan, who had already served al-Mutawakkil. During his caliphate, the Caliph retained some freedom of action, but after his death in 877, he was replaced by al-Muwaffaq's secretary, Sulayman ibn Wahb. Ibn Wahb was soon disgraced and replaced as vizier by Isma'il ibn Bulbul. Real power however lay again with al-Muwaffaq's new secretary, Sa'id ibn Makhlad, until his own disgrace and downfall in 885, after which Ibn Bulbul became the sole vizier to both al-Mu'tamid and al-Muwaffaq.

On 20 July 875, al-Mu'tamid formally arranged for the governance of the state and his succession: his underage son Ja'far was given the honorific name al-Mufawwad ila-llah, was named heir-apparent and assigned the western half of the Caliphate—Ifriqiya, Egypt, Syria, the Jazira and Mosul, Armenia, Mihrajanqadhaq and Hulwan— while al-Muwaffaq received the eastern provinces and was named second heir, except for the event that the Caliph died while al-Mufawwad was still a minor. In practice, al-Mufawwad never exercised any real authority, and al-Muwaffaq continued to exercise control over the western provinces as well through his trusted lieutenant Musa ibn Bugha, who was named al-Mufawwad's deputy. Al-Muwaffaq's power was strengthened by the military threats the Caliphate faced on all fronts, since he commanded the loyalty of the army. In April 876, al-Muwaffaq and Musa ibn Bugha defeated Ya'qub ibn al-Layth's attempt to capture Baghdad at the Battle of Dayr al-'Aqul and saved the Caliphate from collapse. The repulse of the Saffarids then allowed the Abbasids to concentrate their resources in suppressing the Zanj Revolt in the south. The Zanj rebels had managed to capture much of lower Iraq, and inflicted several defeats on the Abbasid troops. In 879, al-Muwaffaq's son Abu'l-Abbas, the future Caliph al-Mu'tadid, was given the command against the Zanj, and in the next year, al-Muwaffaq himself joined the campaign. In a succession of engagements in the marshes of southern Iraq, the Abbasid forces drove back the Zanj towards their capital, Mukhtara, which fell in August 883.

Ibn Tulun and al-Mu'tamid's attempted flight to Egypt

At the same time, al-Muwaffaq also had to contend with the ambitions of Ahmad ibn Tulun in the western provinces. Ibn Tulun and the Abbasid regent fell out in 875/6, on the occasion of a large remittance of revenue from Egypt to the central government. Counting on the rivalry between the Caliph and his over-mighty brother to maintain his own position, Ibn Tulun forwarded a larger share of the taxes to al-Mu'tamid instead of al-Muwaffaq: 2.2 million gold dinars went to the Caliph and only 1.2 million dinars to his brother. Al-Muwaffaq, who in his fight against the Zanj considered himself entitled to the major share of the provincial revenues, was angered by this, and by the implied machinations between Ibn Tulun and his brother. Al-Muwaffaq nominated Musa ibn Bugha as governor of Egypt and sent him with troops to Syria, but a lack of funds led to the expedition's failure before even reaching Egypt. In a public gesture of support for al-Mu'tamid and opposition to al-Muwaffaq, Ibn Tulun assumed the title of "Servant of the Commander of the Faithful" (mawlā amīr al-muʾminīn) in 878. With the support of al-Mu'tamid, in 877/8 Ibn Tulun managed to be assigned responsibility for the entirety of Syria and the Cilician frontier zone (Thughur) with the Byzantine Empire.

In 881, Ibn Tulun added his own name to coins issued by the mints under his control, along with those of the Caliph and heir apparent, al-Mufawwad. In the autumn of 882, the Tulunid general Lu'lu' defected to the Abbasids, and the cities of the Thughur rejected Tulunid rule, forcing Ibn Tulun to go once again in person to Syria. Al-Mu'tamid used the moment to escape from his confinement in Samarra, and with a small entourage made for Tulunid domains. Messengers from the Caliph reached Ibn Tulun at Damascus, and the ruler of Egypt halted and awaited the Caliph's arrival with great anticipation: not only would the sole source of political legitimacy in the Muslim world reside under his control, but he would also be able to pose as the "rescuer" of the Caliph from his overreaching brother. In the event, however, Sa'id ibn Makhlad managed to alert the governor of Mosul, Ishaq ibn Kundaj, who overtook and defeated al-Mu'tamid and his escort at al-Haditha on the Euphrates. Al-Mu'tamid was brought back to Samarra (February 883), where he was placed under virtual house arrest in the Jawsak Palace. In May/June, he was even moved south to Wasit, where al-Muwaffaq could keep an eye on him in person. Only in March 884 was the powerless Caliph allowed to return to Samarra. In the meantime, he was obliged to denounce Ibn Tulun, and appoint—nominally at least—Ishaq ibn Kundaj as governor of Syria and Egypt.

In 886/7, the Caliph conferred the title of "king" on the long-time ruler of Armenia, Ashot I. Although the Armenian king continued to pay tribute to the Abbasid court and recognize its suzerainty, both he and the various minor Armenian princes were de facto independent monarchs.

Rise of al-Mu'tadid and death

In 889, al-Muwaffaq fell out with his son, Abu'l-Abbas, for reasons that are unclear, and had him imprisoned. Al-Muwaffaq spent the next two years on campaign in the Jibal in what is now western Iran. By the time he returned to Baghdad in May 891, al-Muwaffaq was already nearing death. The garrison commander of Baghdad, and the vizier Isma'il ibn Bulbul, hatched a plot to keep Abu'l-Abbas imprisoned and allow power to pass to al-Mu'tamid. Therefore, they invited the Caliph and his son to come the city, which they did. In the event, however, the attempt to sideline Abu'l-Abbas failed, due to his popularity with the soldiers and the common people: the soldiers set him free, and when al-Muwaffaq died on 2 June, Abu'l-Abbas immediately assumed his father's position. Abu'l-Abbas assumed the title of al-Mu'tadid bi-llah and took his father's position in the line of succession after the Caliph and al-Mufawwad. The powerless al-Mufawwad was pushed aside on 30 April 892, and when al-Mu'tamid died on 14 October 892, "apparently as a result of a surfeit of drink and food" (Hugh N. Kennedy), al-Mu'tadid took power as caliph.

References

Sources 
 
 
 
 
 
 
 
 
 
 
 

840s births
892 deaths
Year of birth uncertain
9th-century Arabs
9th-century Abbasid caliphs
Prisoners and detainees of the Abbasid Caliphate
Sons of Abbasid caliphs